Zhang Guoqiang (Chinese: 张国强; Pinyin: Zhang Guoqiáng; born September 30, 1969) is a Chinese actor.

Childhood
Zhang was born to a family of entertainers. His mother's grandfather was a famous Pingju (a kind of Chinese folk opera) performer. His parents were also opera performers.

Personal life
Zhang Guoqiang has one son.

Zhang Guoqiang has maintained strong friendships with fellow Soldiers' Sortie and My Chief, My Regiment cast members, such as Zhang Yi, Duan Yihong and Chen Sicheng, as well as with director Kang Honglei. He is in charge of organizing cast-and-crew reunions during off-time in Beijing.

Filmography
 Dearest (2014)
 The Rescue (2020) (cameo)

References

1969 births
Living people
People from Jiamusi
Male actors from Heilongjiang
Chinese male film actors
Chinese male television actors